The South African Car of the Year is an annual Car of the Year award organised by the South African Guild of Motoring Journalists. The award process is widely regarded for its attention to depth and detail. The vehicles that are selected as finalists are thoroughly tested and driven for a number of days by the journalists before the winner is chosen based upon the journalist's scores.

Recipients of the award

Most wins by manufacturer

See also
 Car of the Year
 List of motor vehicle awards

References

Motor vehicle awards